The Uman Regiment was one of the seventeen territorial-administrative subdivisions of the Hetman State. But after the division of the Hetman State the regiment became part of  the Right-bank Ukraine. The Regiment consisted of 10 sotnias.
The regiment's capital was the city of Uman, now in Cherkasy Oblast of central Ukraine.

The regiment was established in 1648 at the outbreak of the Khmelnytsky Uprising. When the Ruin occurred the regiment was placed under the control of Right-bank Ukraine hetmans. The regiment was split during the 1670s as a result of factional fighting between its colonel, Mykhailo Khanenko, and Hetman Petro Doroshenko. Which caused half of the troops to join forces with invading Left-bank Ukraine Cossacks. The regiment was eventually disbanded in 1686.

The regiment was recreated in 1704 under Ivan Mazepa who reunited both banks under his rule during the Great Northern War, but was dissolved in 1712 when the territory was returned to the Polish–Lithuanian Commonwealth.

External links
Уманський козацький полк
Encyclopedia of Ukraine

Cossack Hetmanate Regiments
History of Cherkasy Oblast